Methodist Girls' High School is a secondary school for girls located in Yaba, Lagos, Nigeria. It was established in 1879 and affiliated with the Methodist Church. It is the second female secondary school and the third oldest secondary school in Nigeria.It is the sister School of Methodist Boys High School.

Alumni
 Chief (Mrs) HID Awolowo, née Adelana (1915-2015), businesswomen and politician.
 Professor Ibiyinka Fuwape, theoretical physicist.
 Alhaja Lateefat Okunnu, née Oyekan (born 1939), civil servant and administrator.
 Chief (Mrs) Folake Solanke SAN, née Odulate (born 1932), lawyer and administrator.

References

Girls' schools in Lagos
Methodist schools
1879 establishments in Lagos Colony
Christian schools in Nigeria
Educational institutions established in 1879